Alexander Meiklejohn (3 February 1872 – 17 December 1964) was a philosopher, university administrator, educational reformer, and free-speech advocate, best known as president of Amherst College.

Background

Alexander Meiklejohn was born on February 3, 1872, in Newbold Street, Rochdale, Lancashire, England. He was of Scottish descent, and the youngest of eight sons. When he was eight, the family moved to the United States, settling in Rhode Island. Family members pooled their money to send him to school. He earned bachelor's and master's degrees at Brown University, graduating Phi Beta Kappa, and completed his doctorate in philosophy at Cornell in 1897. At Brown, he was a member of Theta Delta Chi.

Career

In 1897, Meiklejohn began teaching at Brown. In 1901, he became second dean of the university, a position he held for twelve years. The first-year advising program at Brown bears his name.

From 1912 to 1923, Meiklejohn served as president of Amherst College. His presidency ended with his forced resignation for trying to apply his reforms, and thirteen students refused their diplomas that year in protest. 

Although he was offered the presidency of other colleges, Meiklejohn proposed to open a new, experimental liberal arts college. He was unable to develop adequate funding for creating an entirely new school, but he was invited by Glenn Frank, new president of the University of Wisconsin, to create the University of Wisconsin Experimental College there, which ran from 1927 to 1932. He retired from the University of Wisconsin in 1938, having already moved to Berkeley, California. He was a cofounder of the School of Social Studies in San Francisco, an adult education program focusing on "great books" and American democracy. In 1965, the school became the Meiklejohn Civil Liberties Institute (MCLI), a "non-governmental organization" run by Ann Fagan Ginger.

In 1945, Meiklejohn was a US delegate to the founding meeting of UNESCO in London.

Death

Meiklejohn died at age 92 on December 17, 1964, in Berkeley, California.

On free speech

Meiklejohn was known as an advocate of First Amendment freedoms and was a member of the National Committee of the American Civil Liberties Union (ACLU). He was a notable proponent of the link between freedom of speech and democracy. He argued that the concept of democracy is that of self-government by the people. For such a system to work an informed electorate is necessary. To be appropriately knowledgeable, there must be no constraints on the free flow of information and ideas. According to Meiklejohn, democracy will not be true to its essential ideal if those in power are able to manipulate the electorate by withholding information and stifling criticism. Meiklejohn acknowledges that the desire to manipulate opinion can stem from the motive of seeking to benefit society. However, he argues, choosing manipulation negates, in its means, the democratic ideal. Eric Barendt has called the defense of free speech on the grounds of democracy "probably the most attractive and certainly the most fashionable free speech theory in modern Western democracies".

In Nixon v. Shrink Missouri Government PAC, 528 US 377 (2000), at 401, Justice Stephen Breyer, joined by Justice Ruth Bader Ginsburg, wrote a concurring opinion in support of regulation. In response to protestations that such laws violate citizen's rights to free speech, Breyer held that there were free speech arguments on both sides of the issue. He said that properly framed regulations limiting monetary contributions could substantially expand the opportunity for freedom of expression rather than limit it. He pointed out that the integrity of the electoral process needs to be maintained since that is the means by which a free society translates political advocacy into concrete political action, and that regulating the financing of political campaigns is integral to that advocacy. In doing so, Breyer cited Meiklejohn's interpretation of the First Amendment which gives emphasis to public need rather than individual prerogative.

Awards 

The American Association of University Professors (AAUP) established the Alexander Meiklejohn Freedom Award to honor his work. 

He received the Rosenberger Medal in 1959. Meiklejohn was selected by John F. Kennedy to receive the Presidential Medal of Freedom, which was presented by Lyndon B. Johnson shortly after Kennedy's death.

Legacy 

 Meiklejohn Civil Liberties Institute (MCLI) in Berkeley
 Meiklejohn Advising Program: The Meiklejohn Advising Program is Brown University's advising program for incoming first-year students. Meiklejohn Advisors (known as Meiklejohns for short) are student advisors who are paired with each first-year, along with a faculty advisor, to provide academic advice and help the transition to college.
 Meiklejohn House: The University of Wisconsin–Madison's Meiklejohn House (home to the Integrated Liberal Studies program) continues to espouse the ideals of Meiklejohn's experimental college by engaging students in interdisciplinary liberal education.
 Meiklejohn Hall: Meiklejohn Hall at the California State University, East Bay houses many of the school's liberal arts programs.
 The Evergreen State College in Olympia, WA was deeply influenced by Meiklejohn's pedagogical philosophy during its founding and maintains many of his central principles today.

Books

Meiklejohn wrote books from 1920 to 1960:

 The Liberal College, 1920 (full text online)
 Freedom and the College, 1923
 The Experimental College, 1932 (full text online)
 What Does America Mean?, 1935
 Education Between Two Worlds, 1942 
 Free Speech and Its Relation to Self-Government, 1948 (full text online)
 Political Freedom: the Constitutional Powers of the People, 1960

See also
 Meiklejohnian absolutism
 Meiklejohn Civil Liberties Institute (MCLI)
 John William Ward

Notes

References
 Cynthia Stokes Brown, Alexander Meiklejohn: Teacher of Freedom, MCLI, 1981.
 Ronald K.L. Collins & Sam Chalatin, We Must Not Be Afraid to Be Free: Stories of Free Expression in America (Oxford U. Press, 2011), pp. 39–58.
 Randal Marlin, Propaganda and the Ethics of Persuasion (2nd ed.) (Broadview Press, 2013). .
 Adam R. Nelson, Education and Democracy: The Meaning of Alexander Meiklejohn, 1872-1964 (University of Wisconsin Press, 2001).
 Eugene H. Perry, A Socrates for all Seasons: Alexander Meiklejohn and Deliberative Democracy (Bloomington, Indiana: iUniverse Press, 2011).

External links
 
 Alexander Meiklejohn, Philosopher, Dean, Advocate of Free Speech
 Alexander Meiklejohn and the Experimental College
 Alexander Meiklejohn Papers, News Clippings Concerning the Resignation of President Alexander Meiklejohn, Amherst College Board of Trustees Materials Concerning President Alexander Meiklejohn from the Amherst College Archives & Special Collections
 Meiklejohn Advising – Brown University
 Remembering Alexander Meiklejohn  A tribute by Joseph Tussman, a former student
 Meiklejohn Civil Liberties Institute

People from Rochdale
British educational theorists
British political philosophers
Brown University alumni
Cornell University alumni
Amherst College
University of Wisconsin–Madison faculty
1872 births
1964 deaths
English people of Scottish descent
Free speech activists
First Amendment scholars
20th-century British philosophers
Presidential Medal of Freedom recipients
Presidents of Amherst College